The Moira River is a river in Hastings County in eastern Ontario, Canada. It travels from its source in the centre of the county to the Bay of Quinte at the county seat Belleville .

Name
Originally named the Sagonaska River by the indigenous peoples of the area, the river was renamed in 1807 by the British colonial government (Upper Canada) after Francis Rawdon-Hastings, Earl of Moira. Rawdon-Hastings fought in the American Revolutionary War and had a political career in England, but has no connection with the site. The name Sagonaska continues to be used in the Belleville area, as the name of a bridge over the Moira, and the name of a public school.

Course
The river loops east then back west under the highway at Keller Bridge and continues south to the west of Eldorado. The river takes a sharp turn west, before taking in the right tributary Gawley Creek and heading south again at Malone in the municipality of Marmora and Lake. The river continues east from the lake, enters the municipality of Tweed and takes in the left tributaries Black River and Skootamatta River. The river leaves the lake via two channels, an eastern channel Moira River and the named West Channel, which enclose Sugar Island. It heads southwest, and is paralleled by Highway 37 from Tweed all the way to Belleville. The river flows past Chisholm's lumber Mills, through the northwest corner of the township of Tyendinaga and enters the city of Belleville, continuing southeast. It takes in the right tributaries Chrysal Creek and Palliser Creek, flows over the Belleville Yardmen Dam through the former Laziers Dam Site, the McLeod Dam and the Lott Dam and reaches its mouth at the Bay of Quinte, Lake Ontario.

Watershed
While the Moira river itself is entirely within Hastings County, the watershed includes parts of the next two counties to the east, Lennox and Addington (one east) and Frontenac (two east). Tributaries of the Clare River extend into the township of Central Frontenac in Frontenac County. The Clare River also is in the townships of Stone Mills and Addington Highlands in Lennox and Addington County. The Skootamatta River and tributitaries flow through Addington Highlands as well. The tributaries also extend further north in Hastings County than the Moira itself. For example, Partridge Creek in the Skootamatta system extends past Upper Partridge Lake to 44° 57′ 28″ North in the more northerly Cashel portion of the township of Tudor and Cashel.

Tributaries
Palliser Creek (right)
Chrysal Creek (right)
Clare River (left)
Sulphide Creek (left)
Skootamatta River (left)
Black River (left)
Madoc Creek (left)
Gawley Creek (right)
Jordan River (right)

See also
List of rivers of Ontario

References

Sources

External links
 Canoe Guide Dead link

Rivers of Hastings County
Tributaries of Lake Ontario